David Treasure (born ) is an English-born former professional rugby league footballer who played in the 1970s.

Background
David Treasure is the son of Wilfred Treasure, and Catherine (née Hopton); he was born in Castleford, West Riding of Yorkshire;  he is the younger brother of Anthony Treasure (birth registered during second ¼  in Tadcaster district); Treasure was a pupil at Castleford Grammar School from 1962 to 1967, where he was 3-years below Roger Millward; Treasure worked at Yorkshire Copper Works, Stourton, Leeds; where aged-18 he was the captain of the works' rugby union team (despite a ban on anyone playing rugby union if they had previously played rugby league); he studied Ordinary National Certificate (ONC) Metallurgy at Kitson College, Leeds, then Higher National Certificate (HNC) Metallurgy at Bradford College, he qualified to play for Wales through his grandmother Gwladys Shuttleworth from Llantrisant (birth registered during third ¼ 1889 in Pontypridd district, marriage to Frederick Treasure registered during fourth ¼ 1910 in Tadcaster district); and as of 2018 he resides in Edinburgh, and he works as a Risk-based inspection (RBI) Engineer.

Playing career

International honours
David Treasure won caps for Wales while at Oldham in the 1975 Rugby League World Cup; he played , and scored a try in the 12-7 victory over England at Lang Park, Brisbane on Tuesday 10 June 1975, played  in the 8-18 defeat by Australia at Sydney Cricket Ground, Sydney on Saturday 14 June 1975, played  in the 8-13 defeat by New Zealand at Carlaw Park, Auckland on Saturday 28 June 1975, and played  in the 16-22 defeat by England at Wilderspool Stadium, Warrington on Saturday 20 September 1975, and in the 1977 European Championship; he played left-, i.e. number 4, in the 2-13 defeat by France at Stade des Minimes, Toulouse on Sunday 20 February 1977.

Challenge Cup Final appearances
David Treasure played as an interchange/substitute (replacing  Michael "Mike" Blacker) in Bradford Northern's 14-33 defeat by Featherstone Rovers in the 1973 Challenge Cup Final during the 1972–73 season at Wembley Stadium, London on Saturday 12 May 1973, in front of a crowd of 72,395.

Club career
David Treasure secured his signing by scoring 5 tries in the Bradford Northern A-Team match against Hunslet; at that time Bradford Northern's A-Team coach was Stan Kielty. Treasure made his début for Bradford Northern at Fartown Ground, Huddersfield. He was transferred from Bradford Northern to Oldham. During Oldham's match against Bradford Northern, and following a tackle that Treasure had made on a Bradford Northern , the prop sat on Treasure's knee, the physio and specialists were unable to determine the extent of the injury, as the technology of the era did not allow for scans, and although damaged cartilage was removed via arthroscopy, Treasure retired from rugby league. It was subsequently discovered that he had snapped his anterior cruciate ligament (ACL).

References

External links
Statistics at orl-heritagetrust.org.uk
Photograph "Treasure bursts down the middle - Dave Treasure bursts down the middle to beat all Keighley opposition and touch down between the posts for the first of two tries at Odsal. - 20/08/1972" at rlhp.co.uk
Photograph "Young starlet - Young starlet, David Treasure, races away with Bernard Watson in support during the game against Swinton at Odsal won by 16 points to 10. - 13/02/1971" at rlhp.co.uk
Photograph "David Treasure, Star Sub. - The sub, who was star of the match, David Treasure who came on for the injured Rudi Francis. Here he is scoring his second try. - 25/02/1973" at rlhp.co.uk
Photograph "The team ready to leave - The players give the thumbs up as they prepare to board the coach for Wembley. - 11/05/1973" at rlhp.co.uk
Photograph "Roy Castle meets the players - The players meet Roy Castle prior to the Final. - 11/05/1973" at rlhp.co.uk
Photograph "The teams take to the field - Harry Womersley proudly leads the Northern team on to the field. - 12/05/1973" at rlhp.co.uk
Photograph "Offload - Phil Jackson gets the ball out of the tackle to the supporting Treasure - 07/09/1973" at rlhp.co.uk
Photograph "Hogan looks to pass - Brian Hogan looks for support as Treasure backs up. - 14/10/1973" at rlhp.co.uk
Search for "David Treasure" at britishnewspaperarchive.co.uk

1950 births
Living people
Bradford Bulls players
English people of Welsh descent
English rugby league players
Oldham R.L.F.C. players
Rugby league centres
Rugby league fullbacks
Rugby league halfbacks
Rugby league players from Castleford
Wales national rugby league team players